The Dacca Bank (1846) was a bank founded in the year 1846 in Dhaka, British India. The bank was the thirty second oldest bank in India.

History

Founding 

The bank was founded in 1846 in Dhaka by Khwaja Alimullah. He was a merchant and the largest and most influential zamindar in East Bengal. He also managed to maintain friendly relations with the British during the British Raj in India. The bank was started with a capital of four lakh rupees.

Management 

After his death, Khwaja Alimullah was succeeded by his son Khwaja Abdul Ghani, who continued to manage the affairs of the bank after him. The directors of the Dacca Bank were J P Wise, R J Carnegie, J G N Pogose, Babu Mirtunjoy Dutt, Babu Dinanath Ghosh, William Foley and G M Reilly.

Final Years 

The bank was acquired by the Bank of Calcutta in 1862. The last few branches of the bank were shut in 1877 and were gradually replace by the branches of the Bank of Calcutta.

Legacy 

The bank is notable for being the thirty second oldest bank in India. The bank is also notable for being the very first private bank started in the present day country of Bangladesh.

See also

Indian banking
List of banks in India
List of oldest banks in India

References

External links
 Oldest Banks in India
 Banking in India

Defunct banks of India
Banks established in 1846